Karim Masroor ( born in 1955, Mashhad) is a retired Iranian football player. He was known as ( Golden Head) due to his many goals scored through headers.

Playing career

Club career
He played for Pas Mashhad and F.C. Aboumoslem. His most memorable games were a friendly vs Neftianik Baku and a game versus Persepolis F.C. where he was enjoying himself dribbling past Ali Parvin throughout the game and he scored a goal in that game.  His striking partner upfront for F.C. Aboumoslem was Majid Tafreshi. His other team mates were Reza Abbasi, Mohammad Panjali, Akbar Misaghian and Mohammad Azam.

National career
He was a member of Iran national under-20 football team in 1973–1974. His team mates were Hafez Tahouni, Hassan Rowshan, Nouri Khodayari, Parviz Mazloomi, Mahmoud Haghighian, Gholam Hossein Peyrovani, Hadi Naraghi to name a few.

Achievements
In one of the Takht Jamshid Cup league seasons during the 1970s, he scored 11 goals.

References

Iranian footballers
F.C. Aboomoslem players
Living people
Sportspeople from Mashhad
1955 births
Association football forwards